Ian Woodward Falconer (August 25, 1959 – March 7, 2023) was an American author and illustrator of children's books, and a designer of sets and costumes for the theater. He created 30 covers for The New Yorker as well as other publications. Falconer wrote and illustrated the Olivia series of children's books, chronicling the adventures of a young pig, a series initially conceived as a Christmas gift for his young niece.

Theater designs
Falconer was active in the world of theater design. In 1987, he assisted the artist David Hockney with the costume designs for the Los Angeles Opera's production of Richard Wagner's , Tristan Und Isolde, and in 1992, assisted Hockney with the Chicago Lyric Opera\'s production of Puccini's Turandot. In 1992, Falconer designed the costumes (Hockney designed the sets) for The Royal Opera's production of Richard Strauss's Die Frau ohne Schatten at Covent Garden.

In 1996, Falconer designed the set for The Atlantic Theater's production of The Santaland Diaries, written by David Sedaris. Of this, the theater critic for The New York Times, Ben Brantley, wrote, "The cartoon cutout set by Ian Falconer looks totally chic in its monochromatic grayness."

In 1999, Falconer designed scenery and costumes for the Boston Ballet's production of Firebird, choreographed by Christopher Wheeldon. That same year, he designed the sets for Igor Stravinsky's Scènes de Ballet, and in 2001, the sets and costumes for Felix Mendelssohn's Variations Sérieuses, both choreographed for the New York City Ballet by Wheeldon. In 2002, Falconer designed the sets and costumes for Stravinsky's Jeu de Cartes, choreographed for the New York City Ballet by Peter Martins.

In 2008, Falconer designed the sets and oversaw the installation for the operetta Veronique at the Théâtre du Châtelet in Paris. The critic Francis Carlin noted that, "...Ian Falconer’s clever play-off between background film and lavish sets climaxes in a stunning society ball."

Starting with the 2015 season, the Pacific Northwest Ballet's Nutcracker features costumes and sets designed by Falconer.

Personal life and death
Ian Woodward Falconer was born on August 25, 1959, in Ridgefield, Connecticut. He graduated from The Cambridge School of Weston, and studied art history at New York University before transfers to the Parsons School of Design and the Otis Art Institute. He was gay. According to the designer and filmmaker Tom Ford, Falconer's boyfriends included the artist David Hockney, and Ford himself. Ford said in interviews since that he and Falconer had remained good friends. Decades after their breakup, Ford used Falconer's surname for the title character of A Single Man, his 2009 film (based on Christopher Isherwood's novel, in which the title character has no surname).

Falconer lived in Rowayton, Connecticut, a village within the city of Norwalk. He died from kidney failure in Norwalk on March 7, 2023, at the age of 63.

Written works
In the Olivia series:
 Olivia (New York: Atheneum Books for Young Readers, 2000).
 Olivia Saves the Circus (New York: Atheneum Books for Young Readers, 2001) - winner of  the 2002 Booksense Illustrated Children's Book of the Year.
 Olivia's Opposites (New York: Atheneum Books for Young Readers, 2002)
 Olivia Counts (New York: Atheneum Books for Young Readers, 2002)
 Olivia...and the Missing Toy (New York: Atheneum Books for Young Readers, 2003).
 Teatro Olivia (New York: Rizzoli Universe Promotional Books, 2004).
 Olivia Forms a Band (New York: Atheneum Books for Young Readers, 2006) - winner of the 2006 Child Magazine's Best Children's Book Award.
 Dream Big (starring Olivia) (New York: Andrews McMeel Publishing, 2006).
 Olivia Helps with Christmas (New York: Atheneum Books for Young Readers, 2007) - winner of the 2008 Illustrator of the Year in the Children's Choice Book Awards)
 Olivia Goes to Venice (New York: Atheneum Books for Young Readers, 2010).
 Olivia and the Fairy Princesses (New York: Atheneum Books for Young Readers, 2012).
 Olivia's ABC (New York: Atheneum Books for Young Readers, 2014).
 Olivia the Spy (New York: Atheneum Books for Young Readers , 2017).

Awards
Caldecott Honor for Olivia, 2000
Parents' Choice 2000, Gold Award Winner
Nick Jr. Books, Best Book of 2001
American Library Association, Notable Children's Books of 2001, for Olivia.
Child's Best Book of 2001
Los Angeles Times Best Books of 2000 & 2001
Publishers Weekly, Best Books of 2000 & 2001
American Library Association, Notable Children's Books of 2002, for Olivia Saves the Circus.
BookSense Illustrated Children's Book of the Year, 2002, for Olivia Saves the Circus.
Voted "Favorite Illustrator" for Olivia Helps with Christmas by over 50,000 children at the Children's Choice Book Awards, 2008

References

External links

Ian Falconer at publisher Simon & Schuster
 
 
 

1959 births
2023 deaths
20th-century American male writers
21st-century American male writers
American children's writers
American gay writers
American illustrators
Ballet designers
Deaths from kidney failure
American gay artists
LGBT people from Connecticut
Parsons School of Design alumni
People from Ridgefield, Connecticut
People from Norwalk, Connecticut